Aleksandar Ristevski (born 11 May 1992) is a Macedonian footballer who currently plays as a defender for Vllaznia Shkodër in the Albanian Superliga.

References

External links
Profile at MacedonianFootball Aleksander Ristevski is an intelligent defender/player. His technique is good, very athletic,fast and very good at air duels. Many journalists, trainers, sporty people call him the "foreign-style modern defender." 
Football Federation of Macedonia 

1992 births
Living people
Sportspeople from Prilep
Association football defenders
Macedonian footballers
FK Pelister players
FK Skopje players
FK Metalurg Skopje players
FK Mladost Carev Dvor players
FK Pobeda players
FK Renova players
KF Vllaznia Shkodër players
Macedonian First Football League players
Macedonian Second Football League players
Kategoria Superiore players
Macedonian expatriate footballers
Expatriate footballers in Albania
Macedonian expatriate sportspeople in Albania